The 2016–17 Serie A2 season, known for sponsorship reasons as the Serie A2 Citroën, is the 43rd season of the Italian basketball second league Serie A2 Basket. The season started on October 2, 2016, and will end in June 2017 with the last game of the promotion playoffs finals.

Rules

The season is composed of 32 teams with a regional subdivision in two equal groups of sixteen, East and West. Each team plays the others in its subgroup twice, the first ranked team of each group then plays the eighth ranked team of the other group (e.g. East #1 against West #8), then the second best against the seventh, and so on, to form a promotion playoffs (for one place) of sixteen teams.

Teams

By region

Venues

East

West

Personnel and sponsorship

East

West

Regular season

East Group league table

West Group league table

Coppa Italia

At the half of the league, the four first teams of each group in the table play the LNP Cup, known as Turkish Airlines Cup for sponsorship reasons, at the Unipol Arena in Bologna, from 3 to 5 March 2017.

Bracket

Playout
The league play-out are played between the 14th and 15th placed teams of each group in two elimination rounds. The series will be played in a best-of-five format: the first, the second and the eventual fifth game will be played at home of the team that got the better ranking at the end of the regular season, the third and the eventual fourth will be played at home the lower ranked team.

All matches will be played between 30 April and 24 May 2017 (eventual Game 5).

Playoffs
The league's playoffs are played between the first and the eighth of each group in four rounds: eightfinals, quarterfinals, semifinals and final. All series are played in a best-of-five format: the first, the second and the eventual fifth match will be played at home of the best-placed team, the second, the third and the fourth, at the end of the regular season.

All matches are played between 30 April and 21 June 2017 (eventual Game 5).

Source: LNP

Sponsors

References

External links
Official website 

Serie A2 Basket seasons
2016–17 in Italian basketball
Italy